Prakruti Mishra is an Indian actress known for her work in Odia films and Hindi television. She has received the National Film Award (Special Mention) for Hello Arsi. She was most recent seen as Devanyi In Jai Kanhaiya Lal Kion Star Bharat, as Bitti in Bitti Business Walion & TV  and in the reality show of MTV Ace Of Space 2 in which she was 5th runner up.

Early life
Mishra is the second child of Odia music director Manmath Mishra and news reader Krushnapriya Mishra. She completed schooling from Venkateswar English Medium School, Bhubaneswar, followed by studying Commerce at Rama Devi Women's College, Bhubaneswar. Later, she studied B.A. from Bhavan's College, West Mumbai.

Mishra has learnt Odissi dance from Guru Gangadhar Pradhan.

Career
Mishra made her acting debut as a child artist at the age of five with the film Sabata Maa and Suna Pankhuri . She rose to popularity after she appeared in ETV Odia's Tulasi playing Smruti. In 2006, she won the Odisha State Film Award for Best Child Actor for Sashughara Chalijibi.

She made her debut in Ollywood as a lead actress with the film Thukool alongside Babushan. She then starred in more than 10 Odia feature films.

In 2014, Mishra participated in Zee TV's India's Best Cinestars Ki Khoj. She went on to star in various Odia films. In 2018 she also played Madhura In Laal Ishq in an episodic role.

She gained nationwide recognition for her role in Bitti Business Walli, a Hindi serial aired on &TV.

In 2019, she participated in MTV India's Ace Of Space 2'', emerging as a finalist.

Filmography

Films

Television

Web series

Music videos

Awards and nominations

References

External links 

Living people
Year of birth missing (living people)
Actresses from Bhubaneswar
Indian film actresses
Indian television actresses
Indian web series actresses
Actresses in Odia cinema
Actresses in Odia television
Actresses in Hindi cinema
Actresses in Hindi television
Female models from Odisha
Special Mention (feature film) National Film Award winners
21st-century Indian actresses